Celle sul Rigo is a village in Tuscany, central Italy, administratively a frazione of the comune of San Casciano dei Bagni, province of Siena. At the time of the 2001 census its population was 377.

Celle sul Rigo is about 80 km from Siena and 6 km from San Casciano dei Bagni.

References 

Frazioni of the Province of Siena
San Casciano dei Bagni